Chirala, is a city in Bapatla district of the Indian state of Andhra Pradesh. It is a municipality and the headquarters of Chirala mandal in Chirala revenue division. , it had a population of above 170,000.

Chirala is the most populated city in Bapatla Lok Sabha Parliamentary Constituency.

Etymology 
The city was also known as Kshirapuri, (క్షీరపురి, Telugu) which means "sea of milk" in Sanskrit.The city was carved out of Sudhanagaram, original name of Patha Chirala, that was granted to Chirala Anantharaju by Goparaju Ramanna, Minister of the Kakatiya king, Ganapati Deva, during Saka 1067 (1145 AD) as mentioned in the records obtained from the Madras Oriental Library. His descendant, Chirala Venkata Krishnudu, leased out the present Chirala area for raising a new township. Thus, present-day Chirala was born on 1604 AD.

Independence Movement- Chirala Perala Movement 
Chirala name was carved in Independence struggle

The then British government has laid taxes which was very higher and to protest same people under leadership of Duggirala Gopalakrishnayya left their homes and town and erected temporary huts outside town limits. They led this non violent protest for almost 11 months.

Geography 

Climate 
Hot summers and cool winters are observed due to its proximity to the coast of Bay of Bengal. It receives both South west monsoon and North-east monsoon as well.

Governance 
Chirala retained its position as municipal town since 1871  census of India except for a short period of about town years from 1938 to 1940 when it was suspended and it was converted in to Panchayat, due to political reason. Its position as municipal town was again restored in December, 1940.At present Chirala Municipality is the civic governing body of the city. The present Municipal Commissioner of the city is P.Sreenivasa Rao. The constituents of Chirala urban agglomeration include, Chirala Municipality, census City of Chirala, Vetapalem; out growths of Ipurupalem, Ramakrishna Puram and Kothapeta.

Economy 

Handloom weaving industry is one of the main occupation the city. Several Cloth Market Complexes are situated in Chirala. Chirala is known as Small Bombay.

Chirala is famous tourist place for several beaches, Vadarevu is shortest distance beach from Hyderabad and Telangana via Nagarjuna sagar and Macherla route. Every weekend lot of IT folks from Hyderabad City visiting Vadarevu beach for boat amusement and seafood food. Chirala has several beach resorts like Ramapuram Beach, Vadarevu Beach and New Vadarevu beach. AP Govt. sanctioned Fish harbour to Vadarevu Beach

Chirala has ITC Factory which process cigarette raw materials.

Demographics 

 census of India, the city had a population of 172,826 with 23,070 households. It shows 2.04% growth in population, compared to 2001 Census of India which was recorded as 100,455. The total population constitute, 52,927 males and 47,528 females —a sex ratio of 1031 females per 1000 males, higher than the national average of 940 per 1000. 8,389 children are in the age group of 0–6 years, of which 4,253 are boys and 4,136 are girls —a ratio of 973 girls per 1000 boys. The average literacy rate stands at 78.80% with 62,099 literates, higher than the national average of 73.00%.

The urban agglomeration population of the city is 162,471.

Transport 

The town is also well connected with National and State highways. The National Highway 216 passes through the town, which connects Ongole with Kattipudi . State Highway 48, also referred as Guntur-Bapatla-Chirala Road, connects the city with Guntur. National Highway 167A connects it with Piduguralla, which passes through Narasaraopet and Chilakaluripet.

Public transport includes the buses operated by state-run APSRTC services.  railway station is an A–Category station in Vijayawada railway division of South Central Railway zone and it is located on the Howrah-Chennai main line of Indian Railways.

Education

The primary and secondary school education is imparted by government, aided and private schools, under the School Education Department of the state. The medium of instruction followed by different schools are English and Telugu. VRS & YRN College is a famous college in Chirala. It has provided education requirements for decades now.

Chirala is an educational hub in Bapatla District, its Engineering colleges include St. Ann's College of Engineering and Technology, Chirala Engineering College and VRS & YRN College of Engineering. St Ann's Pharmacy College and Polytechnic College.

See also 
List of towns in Andhra Pradesh
 List of municipalities in Andhra Pradesh

References 

 
Towns in Prakasam district
Mandal headquarters in Prakasam district